Meat Puppets is the first album by American band the Meat Puppets, released in 1982. The album is unlike their later, better-known releases due to its hardcore punk sound.

The album was recorded in a matter of days, there are very few overdubs and many of the tracks are first takes. Like other early SST albums the sound quality is rather spotty; there is noticeable fuzz in the background of the music. The band opted for this because they felt more comfortable recording live with only a few microphones rather than employing conventional studio separation techniques. In 1999, Curt Kirkwood stated, "The first [album] was our LSD record. We were three days in the studio, and we tripped the whole time. And it was really cool, and really trying, too, because we went insane."

The 1999 Rykodisc reissue features the entire In a Car EP as well as 13 other bonus tracks, many of them studio jams or outtakes, and a video clip of the band performing "Walking Boss" live. The booklet also has liner notes by Gregg Turkington and recording notes by drummer Derrick Bostrom.

In the 2012 book, Too High to Die: Meet the Meat Puppets by Greg Prato, an entire chapter is dedicated to Soundgarden guitarist Kim Thayil explaining why Meat Puppets is one of his favorite all-time albums.

Track listing 
All songs written by Meat Puppets, unless otherwise noted.

Original album 

 "Reward" – 1:11
 "Love Offering" – 1:28
 "Blue-Green God" – 1:22
 "Walking Boss" (Doc Watson) – 2:52
 "Melons Rising" – 0:53
 "Saturday Morning" – 1:30
 "Our Friends" – 2:11
 "Tumbling Tumbleweeds" (Bob Nolan) – 2:02
 "Milo, Sorghum, and Maize" – 2:15
 "Meat Puppets" – 1:38
 "Playing Dead" – 1:28
 "Litterbox" – 0:50
 "Electromud" – 0:47
 "The Gold Mine" – 1:02

1999 CD bonus tracks 

"In a Car" - 1:21
"Big House" - 1:07
"Dolphin Field" - 1:09
"Out in the Gardener" - 1:04
"Foreign Lawns" - 0:37
"Meat Puppets" - 1:33
"Everybody's Talking" (Fred Neil) - 2:42
"H-Elenore" (Curt Kirkwood) - 1:39
"Hair" (Monitor) - 1:26
"I Got a Right" (Iggy Pop) - 2:40
"I Am a Child" (Neil Young) - 2:14
<li>"Franklin's Tower" (Jerry Garcia, Robert Hunter, Bill Kreutzmann) - 4:52
"Milo Sorghum & Maize" - 1:32
"Electromud" - 0:45
"Love Offering" - 1:03
"Saturday Morning" - 1:11
"Magic Toy Missing" (Curt Kirkwood) - 1:28
"Unpleasant" (Curt Kirkwood, Derrick Bostrom) - 1:02

 Tracks 15-19 are from the In a Car EP.

Recording 
All the songs on the original album are recorded in November 1981. Engineered by SPOT at Unicorn Studio 24 November 1981. Mixed by SPOT at Music Lab 10 May 1982 except "The Gold Mine" mixed by Laurie O'Connell & Ed Barger.

Personnel 
Meat Puppets
 Derrick Bostrom – drums
 Cris Kirkwood – bass
 Curt Kirkwood – guitar, vocals
with:
 Steve Thompson – keyboards on "Hair"

Production and other credits 
 Engineer – Spot (Except tracks 15-19, 23 & 27-32)
 Engineer (tracks 15-19, 23)  – Ed Barger
 Engineer (tracks 27-32)  – ?
 Mixing – Spot, except Laurie O'Connell & Ed Barger ("The Gold Mine") and Ed Barger (tracks 15-19, 23)
 Cover art – Curt Kirkwood and Damon Bostrom

References 

1982 debut albums
Meat Puppets albums
SST Records albums
Hardcore punk albums by American artists